Gløersen is a surname. Notable people with the surname include:

Anders Gløersen (born 1986), Norwegian cross-country skier
Inger Alver Gløersen (1892–1982), Norwegian writer
Jacob Gløersen (1852–1912), Norwegian painter
Kari Gløersen (born 1948), Norwegian politician